Vrakúň is a village and municipality in the Dunajská Streda District in the Trnava Region of south-west Slovakia.

History

The present-day municipality was formed in 1940 being when Várkony (Vrakúň) and Csallóköznyék (Nekyje na Ostrove) villages were unified under the name of Nyékvárkony by the Hungarian authorities.

Vrakúň (Várkony) is an ancient settlement, it existed already in the Avar age and its name is connected to the Oiarchunítani name. The village was first recorded in 1015. It was the age-old estate of the Amadé Family. Nyék was first recorded in 1165, it had first been the tribal territory of the Nyék tribe, later the village belonged to the Pozsony Castle. King Stephen III of Hungary granted nobility for the inhabitants of the village. In 1245, the village was donated to Neku son of Nech and his brother Peter son of Chueg by a charter of King Béla IV of Hungary in which the village is mentioned as Neeku. Until the end of World War I, both component villages were part of Hungary and fell within the Dunaszerdahely district of Pozsony County. After the Austro-Hungarian army disintegrated in November 1918, Czechoslovak troops occupied the area. After the Treaty of Trianon of 1920, the villages became officially part of Czechoslovakia. In November 1938, the First Vienna Award granted the area to Hungary and it was held by Hungary until 1945. After Soviet occupation in 1945, Czechoslovak administration returned and the village became officially part of Czechoslovakia in 1947.

Demography 

In 1910, Csallóköznyék had  had 643, while Várkony had 866, for the most part, Hungarian inhabitants. At the 2001 Census the recorded population of the village was 2537 while an end-2008 estimate by the Statistical Office had the villages's population also as 2588. As of 2001, 92.67 per cent of its population was Hungarian while 7.09 per cent was Slovak.

Roman Catholicism is the majority religion of the village, its adherents numbering 93.61% of the total population.

Geography
The municipality lies at an altitude of 114 metres and covers an area of 38.336 km2.

References

External links
Local news selection at www.parameter.hu 
Mestá-Obce.sk 
Satellite image of the village

Villages and municipalities in Dunajská Streda District
Hungarian communities in Slovakia